The 2011–12 Austrian Cup was the 78th season of Austria's nationwide football cup competition. It commenced with the matches of the preliminary round in July 2011 and concluded with the final on 20 May 2012. The runner-up of the competition, defending champion SV Ried, qualified for the second qualifying round of the 2012–13 UEFA Europa League, as domestic champion FC Red Bull Salzburg gained their first double with a 3–0 victory in Ernst-Happel-Stadion.

Participating teams
The teams the Bundesliga, the First League, the two losers of the First League Relegation Playoff and the winner of the 9 winner of the province cups.

The teams of the preliminary round were nominated by the 9 province-FAs.

Notes:

  Salzburg:SV Grödig B is qualified as Salzburg Cup runners-up

 b : Nominated as Best placed team(s) in Landesliga 

 r : Relegated from Regionalliga

 r : Qualified as Burgenland preliminary winner

Schedule

5–7 August 2011: 1st Round20–21 September 2011: 2nd Round25–26 October 2011: Round of 1610–11 April 2012: Quarterfinals 1-2 Mai 2012: Semifinals20 Mai 2012: Final

Preliminary round
The Preliminary Round involved 66 amateur clubs from all regional federations, divided into smaller groups according to the Austrian federal states. The draw for this round was conducted in Vienna (Ernst Happel Stadion) on 6 July 2011.

|-
|colspan="3" style="background-color:#fcc;"|

|-
|colspan="3" style="background-color:#fcc;"|

|-
|colspan="3" style="background-color:#fcc;"|

|-
|colspan="3" style="background-color:#fcc;"|

|-
|colspan="3" style="background-color:#fcc;"|

First round
The draw for this round was on 25 July 2011. The matches took place on 5 through 7 August 2011.

|-
|colspan="3" style="background-color:#fcc;"|

|-
|colspan="3" style="background-color:#fcc;"|

|-
|colspan="3" style="background-color:#fcc;"|

Second round
The winners from the previous round compete in this stage of the competition. These matches were played on 20 and 21 September 2011.

|-
|colspan="3" style="background-color:#fcc;"|

|-
|colspan="3" style="background-color:#fcc;"|

Third round
The winners from the previous round compete in this stage of the competition. These matches were played on 25 and 26 October 2011.

|-
|colspan="3" style="background-color:#fcc;"|

|-
|colspan="3" style="background-color:#fcc;"|

Quarter-finals
The winners from the previous round compete in this stage of the competition. These matches were played on 10 and 11 April 2012.

Semi-finals
The winners from the previous round compete in this stage of the competition. These matches were played on 1 and 2 May 2012.

Final

References

External links

 Official Site 
 Austriasoccer.at page

Austrian Cup seasons
Cup
Austrian Cup